Moriba Kourouma Kourouma (born 19 January 2003), known as Ilaix Moriba, is a Guinean professional footballer who plays as a central midfielder for La Liga club Valencia, on loan from Bundesliga club RB Leipzig, and the Guinea national team.

Early life
Moriba was born in Conakry, Guinea, to a Guinean mother and a Liberian Krahn father. He holds both Spanish and Guinean citizenship.

Club career

Barcelona
Moriba arrived at Barcelona from Espanyol in 2010. He has been considered one of the best players of his generation, and he has very often played in categories of players far older than him. Moriba really stood out at age 15 when he scored a hat-trick against the Real Madrid U19. The most remarkable feat was his last goal, where he scored from the middle of the pitch at the start of the second half.

In January 2019, as his youth contract was about to expire, clubs such as Manchester City tried to sign him.

The following season he became a regular for Barça B. He scored his first goal on 8 March 2020, the winner in a 3–2 victory against Llagostera.

During the 2020–21 season, Moriba was included in the first team squad for the first time for a La Liga match against Granada. He was an unused substitute in a 4–0 away win. Moriba would later make his first team debut – and as a starter – on 21 January against Cornellà in the round of 32 of the Copa del Rey. He was replaced by Sergio Busquets in the 74th minute of a 2–0 win. On 13 February 2021, he made his La Liga debut in a 5–1 win over Alavés, in which he also provided an assist for Francisco Trincão. He scored his first La Liga goal in a 2–0 away win against Osasuna on 6 March 2021, to become the fifth youngest scorer in club's history, topped only by Ansu Fati, Bojan Krkić, Lionel Messi and Pedri.

On 10 March 2021, Moriba made his UEFA Champions League debut in a 1–1 draw against Paris Saint-Germain in the round of 16, coming on as a substitute for Sergio Busquets in the 79th minute.

RB Leipzig
On 31 August 2021, Moriba joined Bundesliga side RB Leipzig for a fee of €16 million and €6 million additional in variables. Barcelona also reserved the right to 10% of any future sale.

Loan to Valencia
On 28 January 2022, Valencia announced the signing of Moriba, on a loan until the end of the season. Moriba returned for a second loan for the 2022–23 season.

International career
Moriba is a former youth international with Spain, but he is also eligible for both Guinea and Liberia. He eventually chose to play for the Guinea national team, being set to make his debut on the international stage in June 2020, before the COVID-19 pandemic froze the 2020 football season.

On 21 August 2021, Moriba officially chose to change international allegiances from Spain and chose to play with the Guinea national football team. On 27 December 2021, he was included in Guinea's extended 2021 Africa Cup of Nations squad. He debuted with the Guinea national team in a 3–0 friendly loss to Rwanda on 3 January 2022.

Style of play
Due to his physicality and creativity, Moriba has been compared to French footballer Paul Pogba, whose parents and elder brothers are also from Guinea.

Career statistics

Club

International

Honours
Barcelona
Copa del Rey: 2020–21

References

External links

2003 births
Living people
Sportspeople from Conakry
Guinean footballers
Guinea international footballers
Spanish footballers
Footballers from Catalonia
Association football midfielders
Spain youth international footballers
2021 Africa Cup of Nations players
Spanish sportspeople of African descent
Spanish people of Guinean descent
Spanish people of Liberian descent
Sportspeople of Liberian descent
Guinean people of Liberian descent
Guinean emigrants to Spain
Segunda División B players
La Liga players
Bundesliga players
FC Barcelona Atlètic players
FC Barcelona players
Valencia CF players
RB Leipzig players
Spanish expatriate footballers
Guinean expatriate footballers
Spanish expatriate sportspeople in Germany
Guinean expatriate sportspeople in Germany
Expatriate footballers in Germany